Włodzimierz Czarniak (26 May 1934 – 29 January 1964) was a Polish alpine skier. He competed in the men's giant slalom at the 1956 Winter Olympics.

References

1934 births
1964 deaths
Polish male alpine skiers
Olympic alpine skiers of Poland
Alpine skiers at the 1956 Winter Olympics
Sportspeople from Zakopane
20th-century Polish people